Graeme Davis (born Dartford, 1965) is an author, editor and academic researcher, as well as an associate lecturer with The Open University. He is a specialist in mediaeval language and literature, with interests in the Anglo-Saxons, Vikings, Iceland, Greenland and the North Atlantic. Publications include Germanic linguistics and dialectology, mediaeval history of the North Atlantic Region, English literature criticism, and genealogy. Davis received a PhD from University of St. Andrews, and has taught at Manchester Metropolitan University and the University of Northumbria.

He and Karl Bernhardt are the editor of the linguistics monograph series Contemporary Studies in Descriptive Linguistics and Studies in Historical Linguistics. With Karl Bernhardt he is editor of The Buckingham Journal of Language and Linguistics and previously editor of three refereed on-line journals on linguistics, language and literature issued between 2002 and 2006. The journals were Journal of Language and Learning, Journal of Language and Linguistics and Journal of Language and Literature.

References

External links
 Personal website

Living people
1965 births
British medievalists
Linguists from the United Kingdom
Academics of the Open University
Alumni of the University of St Andrews
Academics of Manchester Metropolitan University
Academics of Northumbria University